Nakhon Phanom University (NPU) was established in 2005 by combining the existing tertiary schools of Nakhon Phanom Province, Thailand: Nakhon Phanom Rajabhat University, Nakhon Phanom Technical College, Nakhon Phanom College of Agriculture and Technology, Thatphanom Community Education College, Nawa Community Education College, and Boromarjonani College of Nursing.

Faculties
Nakhon Phanom University is different from other new universities in that it continues the existing functions of the combined institutions. It provides academic training at the vocational, undergraduate, and graduate levels. The faculties, colleges, and institutes are:

 Faculty of Management Sciences and Information Technology
 Faculty of Liberal Arts and Sciences
 Faculty of Industrial Technology (former Nakhon Phanom Technical College)
 Faculty of Agriculture and Technology (former Nakhon Phanom College of Agriculture and Technology)
 Nawa College (former Nawa Industrial Community Education College)
 Thatphanom College (former Thatphanom Industrial Community Education College)
 Boromarjonani College of Nursing, Nakhon Phanom
 Tourism and Service Industry College
 International Aviation College
 Research and Development Institute
 Academic Resources Center
 Language Institute
 Srisongkram Industrial and Technology College

References

External links
 Nakhon Phanom Rajabhat University
 Faculty of Industrial Technology
 Faculty of Agriculture and Technology
 Thatphanom College
 Nawa College
 Boromarajonani College of Nursing, Nakhon Phanom
  Faculty of Management Sciences and Information Technology
 International Aviation College

Universities in Thailand
Buildings and structures in Nakhon Phanom province
Educational institutions established in 2005
2005 establishments in Thailand